Thoothukudi macaroon (or Tuticorin) is a type of macaroon from the port town of Thoothukudi, in the Indian state of Tamil Nadu. Traditional European macaroons are made from egg whites, sugar, and ground almonds. In Thoothukudi the almond was replaced with locally available cashew.

History
Thoothukudi macaroons are basically European macaroons Indianised in Thoothukudi. Macaroon originated in France and Italy but has made its way to different parts of the world. Many of these regions have modified the recipe by adding or modifying the ingredients. Some of the regions have added grated coconut to add a local flavour. In Thooththukkudi almond was replaced with the locally available cashew. The Portuguese introduced Macaroon in India. It came via Ceylon, now Sri Lanka and reached Thooththukkudi, a port town in extreme south India.

Method
Several bakeries in Thoothukudi manufacture the macaroon using the same century-old method. The process starts with the grinding of cashew nuts. The grinding is done in two batches. The first batch produces coarse cashew nut powder while the second batch produces a fine powder. The two types of paste adds to the texture and taste of the final product. The two types of cashew powder are mixed with ground sugar in an electric mixer. Meanwhile, the egg white is separated from the yolk and stored. Finally the egg white is mixed with the mixture of ground cashew nuts and sugar. This is done by hand. The process is known as folding and adds air in the mixture. This gives the final product a fluffy texture. Finally, the mixture is ready and is poured into pipping cones. The Thooththukkudi macaroon has a spiral cone-like appearance and resemblance more of modak than its European counterpart. It follows a slow baking process for six hours with a temperature of 152 °C.

References

cashew dishes
cookies
Indian cuisine
Tamil cuisine
Thoothukudi